The Stranded is a 2019 Thai television series starring Papangkorn Lerkchaleampote, Chutawut Phatrakampol and Oabnithi Wiwattanawarang. The plot revolves around a number of teens who are stranded on an island when a tsunami hits.

Produced by GMM Grammy's Bravo Studios and H2L Media Group in association with Netflix Studios, it was released on November 14, 2019 on Netflix.

Cast

Main 
 Papangkorn Lerkchaleampote (Beam) as Kraam
 Chutavuth Pattarakampol (March) as Anan
 Oabnithi Wiwattanawarang (Oab) as Joey
 Chayanit Chansangavej (Pat) as May
 Kittisak Patomburana (Jack) as Ice
 Ticha Wongthipkanon as Ying
 Chaleeda Gilbert as Arisa
 Chanya McClory as Nahm
 Sinjai Plengpanich as Professor Lin
 Tanapon Sukumpantanasan (Perth) as Krit
 Pamiga Sooksawee (Pam) as Jan
 Siwat Jumlongkul (Mark) as Jack
 Pawin Kulkaranyawich (Win) as Nat
 Tatchapol Thitiapichai (Tan) as Gun

Guest 
 Winai Kraibutr as Kraam's Father/Kraam's Stepfather
 Sarunyoo Wongkrachang (Tua) as Anan's Father
 Hattaya Wongkrachang (Ple) as Anan's Mother
 Sasithorn Panichnok as Kraam's Mother
 Thanchanok Jaroenput as Baby Kraam
 Teerapop Songwaj as 7 year old Kraam
 Nichaphat Chatchaipholrat (Pearwah) as Mint (Northern kids)
 Sahajak Boonthanakit as Ice's Father
 Ornanong Panyawong as May's Mother
 Naphath Vikairungroj (Na) as May's Admirer
 Khwanruedi Klamklom as Nahm's Mother
 Suphasawatt Purnaveja as Nahm's Father
 Iris Chieblam as Young Nahm
 Thanapob Leeluttanakajorn (Tor) as (Northern kids)
 Sutatta Udomsilp (PunPun) as (Northern kids)
 Teeradon Supapunpinyo (James) as (Northern kids)
 Kemisara Paladesh (Belle) as (Northern kids)
 Paris Intarakomalyasut (Ice) as (Northern kids)

Release
The Stranded was released on November 14, 2019 on Netflix.

Episodes

References

External links
 
 

Thai-language Netflix original programming
2010s Thai television series
2019 Thai television series debuts
Television series by GMM Bravo